Edwin Thomas Sandland (1873 – 1939) was an English footballer who played in the Football League for Stoke.

Career
Sandland was born in Stoke-upon-Trent and started his career with local amateur side Newcastle Swifts before earning a move to Stoke in 1894. He played in twelve matches during 1894–95 scoring twice in a 3–1 victory over Liverpool in November 1894. He played just once in 1895–96 and scored against Everton before returning to amateur football with Congleton Hornets.

Career statistics

References

English footballers
Stoke City F.C. players
English Football League players
1873 births
1939 deaths
Association football forwards